The , also known as "TeniPuri Musical", "Tenimyu" or "GekiPuri" (Stage Prince), is a series of live action stage musicals directed by Yukio Ueshima based on manga series The Prince of Tennis created by Takeshi Konomi and serialized by Shueisha in Weekly Shonen Jump.
The first musical premièred in the Golden Week of 2003, and the unexpected popularity, especially among girls, and requests for merchandise of the show encouraged Marvelous Entertainment to follow through with the series. 
In May 2010, after 7 years, 22 musicals, 5 main casts and about 150 different actors had passed, the "first season" came to an end with the last performance of Dream Live 7th on the 23rd. Not too long after the end of the first season the start of a "second season" was commenced. The shows featured a completely new cast and a new script, but covered the same arcs as the first season.

First season

Musical The Prince of Tennis
Musical Tennis no Oujisama

Year: 2003
Date & Place: 30 April – 5 May: Tokyo Metropolitan Art Space (Tokyo), 7 August – 8 August: Nippon Seinen-kan Hall (Tokyo), 13 August – 15 August: Sankei Hall(Osaka) 
Director/choreographer:  Yukio Ueshima 
Screenplay:  Yuuji Mitsuya
Story: Covers the first arc of the story, from Ryoma Echizen's arrival to up to the end of the Seigaku ranking matches.
Cast:Kotaro Yanagi as Ryoma EchizenEiji Takigawa as Kunimitsu TezukaYuichi Tsuchiya as Shuichiro OishiKimeru as Shusuke FujiYamazaki Ichitaro as Eiji KikumaruYoshitsugu Abe as Takashi KawamuraSota Aoyama as Sadaharu InuiEiji Moriyama as Takeshi MomoshiroNaoya Gomoto as Kaoru KaidohYusuke Ishibashi as Satoshi HorioToshiyuki Toyonaga as Kachiro KatoMasaru Hotta as Katsuo MizunoJiro Morikawa as Masashi AraiTerumichi Kamai as Masaya IkedaMasaki Osanai as Daisuke HayashiKatsuo as SasabeYukio Ueshima as Najiroh Echizen
Summer Run:  Takashi Nagayama as Eiji KikumaruRyoji Morimoto as Takashi KawamuraTakeshi Matsumura as Sasabe

Remarkble 1st Match Fudomine
Remarkble 1st Match Fudomine

Year: 2003 - 2004
Date & Place: 30–31 December 2003: Yuupouto kan’i hoken Hall (Tokyo), 1–5 January 2004: Mielparque Hall (Osaka) 
Director/choreographer:  Yukio Ueshima 
Music: Toshihiko Sahashi
Screenplay: Yuuji Mitsuya
Story: Covers the matches between Seigaku and rival school, Fudomine Chuu. 
Special Notes: The original cast of this show had Kotaro Yanagi and Kimeru playing their respective roles of Ryoma Echizen and Shusuke Fuji, and Takashi Nagayama permanently replacing Yamazaki Ichitaro as Eiji Kikumaru. Less than two weeks before the premiere, Yanagi was involved in a car accident and hospitalized. Kimeru took over as Echizen, Nagayama was shifted to Fuji, and Ichitaro was brought back as Kikumaru. 
Cast:
Seigaku: Kimeru as Ryoma EchizenEiji Takigawa as Kunimitsu TezukaYuichi Tsuchiya as Shuichiro OishiTakashi Nagayama as Shusuke FujiYamazaki Ichitaro as Eiji KikumaruYoshitsugu Abe as Takashi KawamuraSota Aoyama as Sadaharu InuiEiji Moriyama as Takeshi MomoshiroNaoya Gomoto as Kaoru KaidohYusuke Ishibashi as Satoshi HorioToshiyuki Toyonaga as Kachiro KatoMasaru Hotta as Katsuo MizunoYukio Ueshima as Nanjiroh Echizen
Fudomine: Takuma Sugawara as Kippei TachibanaRyōsei Konishi as Shinji IbuMatsui Yasuyuki as Akira KamioMamoru Miyano as Tetsu IshidaShun Takagi as Masaya Sakurai

Dream Live 1st
Dream Live 1st

Year:  2004
Date & Place:  13 June: Tokyo Metropolitan Gymnasium (Sendagaya, Tokyo)
Director/choreographer:   Yukio Ueshima 
Music: Toshihiko Sahashi
Screenplay:  Yuuji Mitsuya
Story:  First live concert, featuring songs from the two previous musicals.
Special Notes: Debut of Yuya Endo as the new Ryoma Echizen. Featured Fudomine's Shinji Ibu as a special guest.
Cast:  
Seigaku: Yuya Endo as Ryoma EchizenEiji Takigawa as Kunimitsu TezukaYuichi Tsuchiya as Shuichiro OishiKimeru as Shusuke FujiTakashi Nagayama as Eiji KikumaruYoshitsugu Abe as Takashi KawamuraSota Aoyama as Sadaharu InuiEiji Moriyama as Takeshi MomoshiroNaoya Gomoto as Kaoru KaidohYusuke Ishibashi as Satoshi HorioToshiyuki Toyonaga as Kachiro KatoMasaru Hotta as Katsuo MizunoYukio Ueshima as Najiroh Echizen
Fudomine: Ryōsei Konishi as Shinji Ibu

More than Limit St. Rudolph

More than Limit St.Rudolph Gakuen 

Year:  2004
Date & Place: 29 July  – 8 August: Tokyo  Metropolitan Art Space (Tokyo), 11–15 August 2004: Shinkobe Oriental Theater (Kobe)
Director/choreographer:  Yukio Ueshima 
Music:  Toshihiko Sahashi
Screenplay:   Yuuji Mitsuya
Story:  Covers the matches between Seigaku and the rival school St. Rudolph Gakuin.
Special Notes:  "More Than Limit" featured Kengo Ohkuchi and Eiki Kitamura filling in for the roles of Tezuka and Kawamura respectively.
Cast: 
Seigaku: Yuya Endo as Ryoma EchizenKengo Ohkuchi as Kunimitsu TezukaYuichi Tsuchiya as Shuichiro OishiKimeru as Shusuke FujiTakashi Nagayama as Eiji KikumaruEiki Kitamura as Takashi KawamuraSota Aoyama as Sadaharu InuiEiji Moriyama as Takeshi MomoshiroNaoya Gomoto as Kaoru KaidohYusuke Ishibashi as Satoshi HorioToshiyuki Toyonaga as Kachiro KatoMasaru Hotta as Katsuo Mizuno
St. Rudolph: Hidemasa Shiozawa as Hajime MizukiKENN as Yuuta FujiKenji Aoki as Yoshirou AkazawaMitsuyoshi Shinoda as Shinya YanagisawaRyosuke Kato as Atsushi KisarazuYuki Ohtake as Ichirou Kaneda

Side Fudomine ~Special Match~

Side Fudomine ~Special Match~

Year:  2004 - 2005
Date & Place: 29 December 2004 – 2 January 2005: Tokyo Metropolitan Art Space (Tokyo)
Director/choreographer:   Yukio Ueshima 
Music:  Toshihiko Sahashi
Screenplay:   Yuuji Mitsuya
Story:  Covers the matches between Seigaku and rival school Fudomine Chuu.
Special notes:  Re-run of Remarkable 1st Match Fudomine with extra scenes, and graduation show of the first Seigaku cast. During the run of this musical, Kotaro Yanagi returned and shared the role of Echizen with Yuya Endo, doing the still acting scenes while Endo did the dance and tennis match choreographies. 
Cast: 
Seigaku: Kotaro Yanagi and Yuya Endo as Ryoma EchizenEiji Takigawa as Kunimitsu TezukaYuichi Tsuchiya as Shuichiro OishiKimeru as Shusuke FujiTakashi Nagayama as Eiji KikumaruYoshitsugu Abe as Takashi KawamuraSota Aoyama as Sadaharu InuiEiji Moriyama as Takeshi MomoshiroNaoya Gomoto as Kaoru KaidohYusuke Ishibashi as Satoshi HorioToshiyuki Toyonaga as Kachiro KatoMasaru Hotta as Katsuo MizunoYukio Ueshima as Nanjiroh Echizen
Fudomine: YOH as Kippei TachibanaRyōsei Konishi as Shinji IbuYuki Fujiwara as Akira KamioMamoru Miyano as Tetsu IshidaShun Takagi as Masaya Sakurai

In Winter 2004-2005 Side Yamabuki Feat. St. Rudolph Gakuen

Side Yamabuki

Year: 2005
Date & Place: 8 January – 10 January: Osaka Mielparque Hall (Osaka), 20 January – 23 January: Tokyo Mielparque Hall (Tokyo)
Director/choreographer:  Yukio Ueshima 
Music: Toshihiko Sahashi
Story: Covers the matches between Seigaku and rival school Yamabuki Chuu
Special notes: Debut of the 2nd Seigaku Cast.
Cast: 
Seigaku: Yuya Endo as Ryoma EchizenYuu Shirota as Kunimitsu TezukaHiroki Suzuki as Shuichiro OishiHiroki Aiba as Shusuke FujiOsamu Adachi as Eiji KikumaruYoshikazu Kotani as Takashi KawamuraHirofumi Araki as Sadaharu InuiMasaki Kaji as Takeshi MomoshiroKousuke Kujirai as Kaoru KaidohYusuke Ishibashi as Satoshi HorioToshiyuki Toyonaga as Kachiro KatoMasaru Hotta as Katsuo Mizuno
Yamabuki: JURI as Jin AkutsuYuki Kawakubo as Taichi DanMasato Wada as Kiyosumi SengokuHiroshi Yazaki as Kentarou MinamiIori Hayashi as Masami HigashikataTakahiko Yanagisawa as Muromachi Toji
St. Rudolph: KENN as Yuuta FujiKenji Aoki as Yoshirou AkazawaMitsuyoshi Shinoda as Shinya YanagisawaRyosuke Kato as Atsushi KisarazuYuki Ohtake as Ichirou Kaneda

Dream Live 2nd

Dream Live 2nd 

Year:  2005
Date & Place:  4 May: Tokyo Bay NK Hall (Maihama, Chiba)
Director/choreographer:   Yukio Ueshima 
Music:  Toshihiko Sahashi
Story:  Second live concert, featuring songs from all previous musicals. 
Special notes: Graduation show of Yuya Endo. Kotaro Yanagi returned and again shared the role of Ryoma Echizen once more with Endo; he acted in only one stand still scene while Endo performed throughout the majority of the show. Guest starred members of Fudomine, St. Rudolph and Yamabuki.
Cast:  
Seigaku: Yuya Endo and Kotaro Yanagi as Ryoma EchizenYuu Shirota as Kunimitsu TezukaHiroki Suzuki as Shuichiro OishiHiroki Aiba as Shusuke FujiOsamu Adachi as Eiji KikumaruYoshikazu Kotani as Takashi KawamuraHirofumi Araki as Sadaharu InuiMasaki Kaji as Takeshi MomoshiroKousuke Kujirai as Kaoru KaidohYusuke Ishibashi as Satoshi HorioToshiyuki Toyonaga as Kachiro KatoMasaru Hotta as Katsuo MizunoYukio Ueshima as Najiroh Echizen
Fudomine: YOH as Kippei TachibanaYuki Fujiwara as Akira KamioMamoru Miyano as Tetsu IshidaShun Takagi as Masaya Sakurai
St. Rudolph: Hidemasa Shiozawa as Hajime MizukiKENN as Yuuta FujiKenji Aoki as Yoshirou AkazawaRyosuke Kato as Atsushi KisarazuYuki Ohtake as Ichirou Kaneda
Yamabuki: JURI as Jin AkutsuYuki Kawakubo as Taichi DanMasato Wada as Kiyosumi SengokuHiroshi Yazaki as Kentarou MinamiIori Hayashi as Masami HigashikataTakahiko Yanagisawa as Muromachi Toji

The Imperial Match Hyoutei Gakuen

Imperial Match Hyoutei Gakuen 

Year:  2005
Date & Place: 8 August – 14 August: Nippon Seinen-kan Hall (Tokyo), 17 August – 20 August: Osaka Mielparque Hall (Osaka)
Director/choreographer:   Yukio Ueshima 
Music:  Toshihiko Sahashi
Screenplay:  Yuuji Mitsuya
Story:  Covers the matches between Seigaku and rival school Hyoutei Gakuen
Special notes:  Guest starring members of St. Rudolph and Yamabuki Chuu
Cast:  
Seigaku:  Kotaro Yanagi as Ryoma EchizenYuu Shirota as Kunimitsu TezukaHiroki Suzuki as Shuichiro OishiHiroki Aiba as Shusuke FujiOsamu Adachi as Eiji KikumaruYoshikazu Kotani as Takashi KawamuraHirofumi Araki as Sadaharu InuiMasaki Kaji as Takeshi MomoshiroKousuke Kujirai as Kaoru KaidohYusuke Ishibashi as Satoshi HorioToshiyuki Toyonaga as Kachiro KatoMasaru Hotta as Katsuo Mizuno
Hyoutei:  Kazuki Kato as Keigo AtobeRyo Washimi as Munehiro KabajiTakumi Saito as Yuushi OshitariRuito Aoyagi as Gakuto MukahiKenta Kamakari as Ryoh ShishidoKoji Date as Ootori ChotarohTakuya Konma as Jirou AkutagawaRyunosuke Kawai as Wakashi Hiyoshi
St.Rudolph: Hidemasa Shiozawa as Hajime MizukiKENN as Yuuta FujiMitsuyoshi Shinoda as Shinya Yanagisawa .
Yamabuki: JURI as Jin Akutsu, Yuki Kawakubo as Taichi DanMasato Wada as Kiyosumi Sengoku

The Imperial Match Hyoutei Gakuen in Winter 2005 - 2006

Imperial Match Hyoutei Gakuen in Winter

Year:  2005 - 2006
Date & Place:  19 December – 25 December: Nippon Seinen-kan Hall (Tokyo), 28 December 2005 – 2 January 2006: Osaka Mielparque Hall (Osaka)
Director/choreographer:   Yukio Ueshima 
Music:  Toshihiko Sahashi
Screenplay:   Yuuji Mitsuya
Story:  Covers the story between Seigaku and rival school Hyoutei Gakuen
Special notes:  Re-run of the Imperial Match Hyoutei Gakuen. Guest starring members of Fudomine, St. Rudolph and Yamabuki Chuu.
Cast: 
Seigaku:  Kotaro Yanagi as Ryoma EchizenYuu Shirota as Kunimitsu TezukaHiroki Suzuki as Shuichiro OishiHiroki Aiba as Shusuke FujiOsamu Adachi as Eiji KikumaruYoshikazu Kotani as Takashi KawamuraHirofumi Araki as Sadaharu InuiMasaki Kaji as Takeshi MomoshiroKousuke Kujirai as Kaoru KaidohYusuke Ishibashi as Satoshi HorioToshiyuki Toyonaga as Kachiro KatoMasaru Hotta as Katsuo Mizuno
Hyoutei:  Kazuki Kato as Keigo AtobeRyo Washimi as Munehiro KabajiTakumi Saito as Yuushi OshitariRuito Aoyagi as Gakuto MukahiKenta Kamakari as Ryoh ShishidoKoji Date as Ootori ChotarohTakuya Konma as Jirou AkutagawaRyunosuke Kawai as Wakashi Hiyoshi
St. Rudolph:  KENN as Yuuta FujiKenji Aoki as Yoshirou Akazawa
Yamabuki:  JURI as Jin AkutsuMasato Wada as Kiyosumi SengokuHiroshi Yazaki as Kentarou MinamiIori Hayashi as Masami Higashikata
Fudomine: Mamoru Miyano as Tetsu IshidaShun Takagi as Masaya Sakurai

Dream Live 3rd

Dream Live 3rd 

Year:  2006
Date & Place:  28 March – 29 March: Zepp Tokyo (Odaiba, Tokyo)
Director/choreographer:   Yukio Ueshima 
Music:  Toshihiko Sahashi
Story:  Third live concert, featuring songs from The Imperial Match Hyotei Gakuen in winter musicals.
Special notes: Graduation concert for the entire second Seigaku cast except for Hiroki Aiba. Guest starring all members of Hyotei. 
Cast: 
Seigaku:  Kotaro Yanagi as Ryoma EchizenYuu Shirota as Kunimitsu TezukaHiroki Suzuki as Shuichiro OishiHiroki Aiba as Shusuke FujiOsamu Adachi as Eiji KikumaruYoshikazu Kotani as Takashi KawamuraHirofumi Araki as Sadaharu InuiMasaki Kaji as Takeshi MomoshiroKousuke Kujirai as Kaoru KaidohYusuke Ishibashi as Satoshi HorioToshiyuki Toyonaga as Kachiro KatoMasaru Hotta as Katsuo MizunoYukio Ueshima as Nanjiroh Echizen
Hyoutei:  Kazuki Kato as Keigo AtobeRyo Washimi as Munehiro KabajiTakumi Saito as Yuushi OshitariRuito Aoyagi as Gakuto MukahiKenta Kamakari as Ryoh ShishidoKoji Date as Ootori ChotarohTakuya Konma as Jirou AkutagawaRyunosuke Kawai as Wakashi Hiyoshi

Advancement Match Rokkaku feat. Hyotei Gakuen

 Advancement Match Rokkaku 

Year:  2006
Date & Place:  3 August – 13 August: Nippon Seinen-kan Hall (Tokyo), 16 August – 19 August: Osaka Mielparque Hall (Osaka), 24 August – 27 August: Meitestu Hall (Nagoya)
Director/choreographer:   Yukio Ueshima 
Music:  Toshihiko Sahashi
Screenplay:   Yuuji Mitsuya
Story:  Covers the matches between Seigaku and rival school Rokkaku Chuu
Special notes:  Debut performance of the 3rd Seigaku cast. The original cast of this show had Takahiro Tasaki in the role of Kaoru Kaidoh, but due to Tasaki's withdrawal from the show, Kousuke Kujirai (who had graduated) was brought back to the musical as his replacement. Guest starring all members of Hyotei Gakuen. 
Cast: 
Seigaku:  Dori Sakurada as Ryoma EchizenKeisuke Minami as Kunimitsu TezukaYukihiro Takiguchi as Shuichiro OishiHiroki Aiba as Shusuke FujiKōji Seto as Eiji KikumaruKouji Watanabe as Takashi KawamuraMasei Nakayama as Sadaharu InuiShinpei Takagi as Takeshi MomoshiroKousuke Kujirai as Kaoru KaidohMasaki Hara as Satoshi HorioYuya Mori as Kachiro KatoYuki Okamoto as Katsuo Mizuno
Rokkaku:  Kazuma Kawahara as Aoi KentaroKanata Irei as Kojirou SaekiRyosuke Kato as Ryoh KisarazuAiru Shiozaki as Hikaru AmaneShindo Gaku as Harukaze KurobaneShoma Ikegami as Marehiko Itsuki
Hyoutei:  Kazuki Kato as Keigo AtobeRyo Washimi as Munehiro KabajiTakumi Saito as Yuushi OshitariRuito Aoyagi as Gakuto MukahiKenta Kamakari as Ryoh ShishidoKoji Date as Ootori ChotarohTakuya Konma as Jirou AkutagawaRyunosuke Kawai as Wakashi Hiyoshi

Absolute King Rikkai feat. Rokkaku ~ First Service

 Absolute King Rikkaidai ~1st Service 

Year:  2006 - 2007
Date & Place:  13 December – 25 December: Nippon Seinen-kan Hall (Tokyo), 28 December 2006 – 8 January 2007: Osaka Mielparque Hall (Osaka), 11 January – 14 January: Kagawa-ken Kenmin Hall (Kagawa), 18 January – 21 January: Sunshine Theatre (Tokyo), 25 January – 27 January: Nagoya Shimin Kaikan-chuu Hall (Nagoya)
Director/choreographer:   Yukio Ueshima 
Music:  Toshihiko Sahashi
Screenplay:   Yuuji Mitsuya
Story:  Covers the doubles matches of Seigaku against rival school, Rikkai Daigaku Fuzoku.
Special notes:  Debut of Tomo Yanagishita as Kaoru Kaidoh, Ryou Kawamoto as Kachiro Kato, and
Kouichi Eguchi as Katsuo Mizuno. Guest stars members of Rokkaku Chuu. 
Cast: 
Seigaku:  Dori Sakurada as Ryoma EchizenKeisuke Minami as Kunimitsu TezukaYukihiro Takiguchi as Shuichiro OishiHiroki Aiba as Shusuke FujiKōji Seto as Eiji KikumaruKouji Watanabe as Takashi KawamuraMasei Nakayama as Sadaharu InuiShinpei Takagi as Takeshi MomoshiroTomo Yanagishita as Kaoru KaidohMasaki Hara as Satoshi HorioRyou Kawamoto as Kachiro KatoKouichi Eguchi as Katsuo Mizuno
Rikkaidai:  Ren Yagami as Seiichi YukimuraKentarou Kanesaki as Genichirou SanadaKento Ono as Renji YanagiMasataka Nakagauchi as Masaharu NiouToru Baba as Hiroshi YagyuuGenki Ookawa as Akaya KiriharaRenn Kiriyama as Bunta MaruiJutta Yuuki as Jackal Kuwahara
Rokkaku:  Kazuma Kawahara as Aoi KentaroKanata Irei as Kojirou SaekiRyosuke Kato as Ryou KisarazuAiru Shiozaki as Hikaru AmaneGaku Shindo as Harukaze KurobaneShoma Ikegami as Marehiko Itsuki

Dream Live 4th

Dream Live 4th 

Year:  2007
Date & Place:  30 March – 31 March: Pacifico Yokohama National Convention Hall (Tokyo),  17 May – 20 May: Umeda Arts Center Theatre Drama City (Osaka)
Director/choreographer:   Yukio Ueshima 
Music:  Toshihiko Sahashi
Screenplay:   Yuuji Mitsuya
Story:   Fourth live concert
Special notes:  Featuring members of Fudomine, St. Rudolph, Yamabuki Chuu, Hyotei Gakuen, Rokkaku Chuu and Rikkai Daigaku Fuzoku as special guests. Performances in Osaka featured all members of Seigaku, Rikkai Daigaku Fuzoku and Rokkaku Chuu and had guest starring Yamabuki Chuu's Kiyosumi Sengoku and Kentarou Minami, as well as Hyotei Gakuen's Gakuto Mukahi and Wakashi Hiyoshi. Initially, Kenta Kamakari, who played Hyotei's Ryoh Shishido, was set to appear in Osaka, but as Kamakari was hospitalized and pulled out of the musical, Ryunosuke Kawai as Hiyoshi stepped in.
Cast: 
Seigaku:   Dori Sakurada as Ryoma EchizenKeisuke Minami as Kunimitsu TezukaYukihiro Takiguchi as Shuichiro OishiHiroki Aiba as Shusuke FujiKōji Seto as Eiji KikumaruKouji Watanabe as Takashi KawamuraMasei Nakayama as Sadaharu InuiShinpei Takagi as Takeshi MomoshiroTomo Yanagishita as Kaoru KaidohMasaki Hara as Satoshi HorioRyou Kawamoto as Kachiro KatoKouichi Eguchi as Katsuo MizunoYukio Ueshima as Nanjiroh Echizen
Fudomine:  YOH as Kippei TachibanaYuki Fujiwara as Akira KamioMamoru Miyano as Tetsu IshidaShun Takagi as Masaya Sakurai
St.Rudolph:  Kenji Aoki as Yoshirou AkazawaMitsuyoshi Shinoda as Shinya YanagisawaRyosuke Kato as Atsushi KisarazuYuki Ohtake as Ichirou Kaneda
Yamabuki:  Yuki Kawakubo as Taichi DanMasato Wada as Kiyosumi SengokuHiroshi Yazaki as Kentarou MinamiIori Hayashi as Masami HigashikataTakahiko Yanagisawa as Muromachi Toji,
Hyoutei: Kazuki Kato as Keigo AtobeRyo Washimi as Munehiro Kabaji, Ruito Aoyagi as Gakuto MukahiKenta Kamakari as Ryoh ShishidoKoji Date as Chotaroh OotoriRyunosuke Kawai as Wakashi HiyoshiTakuya Konma as Jiroh AkutagawaTakumi Saito as Yuushi Oshitari
Rokkaku: Kazuma Kawahara as Aoi KentaroKanata Irei as Kojirou SaekiRyosuke Kato as Ryoh KisarazuAiru Shiozaki as Hikaru AmaneGaku Shindo as Harukaze KurobaneShoma Ikegami as Marehiko Itsuki
Rikkai:  Ren Yagami as Seiichi YukimuraKentarou Kanesaki as Genichirou SanadaKento Ono as Renji YanagiMasataka Nakagauchi as Masaharu NiouToru Baba as Hiroshi YagyuuGenki Ookawa as Akaya KiriharaRenn Kiriyama as Bunta MaruiJutta Yuuki as Jackal Kuwahara

Absolute King Rikkai feat. Rokkaku ~ Second Service

 Absolute King Rikkaidai ~2nd Service 

Year:  2007
Date & Place:  2 August – 15 August: Nippon Seinen-kan Hall (Tokyo), 18 August – 25 August: Osaka Mielparque Halla (Osaka), 28 August – 29 August: Kagawa-ken Kenmin Hall Grand Hall (Kagawa), 1 September – 2 September: Fukuoka Shimin Kaikan Dai Hall (Fukuoka), 7 September – 9 September: Gifu Shimin Kaikan Dai Hall (Gifu)
Director/choreographer:   Yukio Ueshima 
Music:  Toshihiko Sahashi
Screenplay:   Yuuji Mitsuya
Story: Covers the singles matches of Seigaku against rival school, Rikkai Daigaku Fuzoku.
Special notes:  Guest starred members of Rokkaku Chuu and two members of the cast of Higa Chuu. Graduation show for the 3rd Seigaku cast, except Tomo Yanagishita.
Cast: 
Seigaku:  Dori Sakurada as Ryoma EchizenKeisuke Minami as Kunimitsu TezukaYukihiro Takiguchi as Shuichiro OishiHiroki Aiba as Shusuke FujiKōji Seto as Eiji KikumaruKouji Watanabe as Takashi KawamuraMasei Nakayama as Sadaharu InuiShinpei Takagi as Takeshi MomoshiroTomo Yanagishita as Kaoru KaidohMasaki Hara as Satoshi HorioRyou Kawamoto as Kachiro KatoKouichi Eguchi as Katsuo Mizuno
Rikkai:  Ren Yagami as Seiichi YukimuraKentarou Kanesaki as Genichirou SanadaKento Ono as Renji YanagiMasataka Nakagauchi as Masaharu NiouToru Baba as Hiroshi YagyuuGenki Ookawa as Akaya KiriharaRenn Kiriyama as Bunta MaruiJutta Yuuki as Jackal Kuwahara
Rokkaku:  Kazuma Kawahara as Aoi KentaroShoma Ikegami as Marehiko ItsukiAiru Shiozaki as Hikaru AmaneGaku Shindo as Harukaze KurobaneRyosuke Kato as Ryou Kisarazu
Higa:  Luke C. as Eishirou KiteTakeshi Hayashino as Hiroshi Chinen

The Progressive Match Higa Chuu feat. Rikkai

The Progressive Match Higa Chuu 

Year:  2007 - 2008
Date & Place:  12 December – 25 December: Nippon Seinen-kan Dai Hall (Tokyo), 28 December 2007 – 6 January 2008: Osaka Mielparque Hall (Osaka), 11 January – 14 January: Kagawa-ken Kenmin Hall Small Act Hall (Kagawa), 17 January – 20 January: Chukyo University Center for Culture & Arts: former Nagoya Shimin Kaikan Chuu-Hall (Aichi), 25 January – 27 January: Komatsu Arts Theatre Urara Dai-Hall (Ishikawa), 31 January – 3 February: Momochi Palace Fukuoka-kenritsu Momochi Culture Center Dai-Hall (Fukuoka), 9 February – 11 February: Ichinoseki Cultural Center Dai-Hall(Iwate)
Director:   Yukio Ueshima 
Choreography:   Yukio Ueshima and Shinnosuke Motoyama 
Music:  Toshihiko Sahashi
Lyrics:  Yuuji Mitsuya 
Screenplay:  Hideki Mitsui
Story:  Covers the matches between Seigaku and rival school Higa Chuu
Special notes:  During this show, Tomo Yanagishita (who had stayed as an alternate), and Yuuichirou Hirata (who was cast as the new Kaidoh) took turns playing the role of Kaidoh for different performances. Hijiri Shinotani had been replaced by Imai Tsunemitsu because he was sick - (Double Yuujirou). 
Cast: 
Seigaku: Shōgo Sakamoto as Ryoma EchizenDaisuke Watanabe as Kunimitsu TezukaYuya Toyoda as Shuichiro OishiYuuta Furukawa as Shusuke FujiKyousuke Hamao as Eiji KikumaruHiroaki Ogasawara as Takashi KawamuraYuuta Takahashi as Sadaharu InuiTetsuya Makita as Takeshi MomoshiroYuuichirou Hirata and Tomo Yanagishita as Kaoru Kaidoh
Higa: Hijiri Shinotani as Yuujirou KaiImai Tsunemitsu as Yuujirou KaiLuke.C (Yousuke Crawford) as Eishirou KiteTakeshi Hayashino as Hiroshi ChinenYasuka Saito as Rin HirakobaYutaka Matsuzaki as Kei Tanishi
Rikkai: Ren Yagami as Seiichi YukimuraKentarou Kanesaki as Genichirou SanadaKento Ono as Renji YanagiMasataka Nakagauchi as Masaharu NiouToru Baba as Hiroshi YagyuuGenki Ookawa as Akaya KiriharaJutta Yuuki as Jackal Kuwahara
Rokkaku: Kanata Irei as Kojirou Saeki

Dream Live 5th

Dream Live 5th  

Year:  2008
Date & Place:  17 May – 18 May: Yokohama Arena (Tokyo), 24 May – 25 May: Kobe World Memorial Hall (Osaka)
Director:   Yukio Ueshima 
Choreography:   Yukio Ueshima and Shinnosuke Motoyama 
Music:  Toshihiko Sahashi
Lyrics:  Yuuji Mitsuya 
Story:  Fifth Live Concert
Special notes:  Yanagishita and Hirata again took turns playing Kaidoh for different performances. Guest starring members of Higa Chuu, Rikkai, Rokkaku Chuu, Hyotei Gakuen, Yamabuki Chuu, St. Rudolph, and Fudomine. Also the graduation show for Tomo Yanagishita.
Cast: 
Seigaku:  Shōgo Sakamoto as Ryoma EchizenDaisuke Watanabe as Kunimitsu TezukaYuya Toyoda as Shuichiro OishiYuuta Furukawa as Shusuke FujiKyousuke Hamao as Eiji KikumaruHiroaki Ogasawara as Takashi KawamuraYuuta Takahashi as Sadaharu InuiTetsuya Makita as Takeshi MomoshiroYuuichirou Hirata and Tomo Yanagishita as Kaoru KaidohYukio Ueshima as Nanjiroh Echizen
Higa:  Hijiri Shinotani as Yuujirou KaiLuke.C (Yousuke Crawford) as Eishirou KiteTakeshi Hayashino as Hiroshi ChinenYasuka Saito as Rin HirakobaYutaka Matsuzaki as Kei Tanishi
Rikkai:  Ren Yagami as Seiichi YukimuraKentarou Kanesaki as Genichirou SanadaKento Ono as Renji YanagiMasataka Nakagauchi as Masaharu NiouToru Baba as Hiroshi YagyuuGenki Ookawa as Akaya KiriharaRenn Kiriyama as Bunta MaruiJutta Yuuki as Jackal Kuwahara
Rokkaku:  Kazuma Kawahara as Aoi KentaroKanata Irei as Kojirou SaekiShoma Ikegami as Marehiko ItsukiRyosuke Kato as Ryou Kisarazu
Hyoutei:  Takumi Saito as Yuushi OshitariRyo Washimi as Munehiro Kabaji
Yamabuki: JURI as Jin Akutsu
St.Rudolph: Yuki Ohtake as Ichiro Kaneda
Fudomine: Mamoru Miyano as Tetsu Ishida

The Imperial Presence Hyotei Gakuen feat. Higa

The Imperial Presence Hyoutei 

Year:  2008
Date & Place:  29 July – 17 August: Nippon Seinen-kan Hall (Tokyo), 20 August – 24 August: Osaka Mielparque Hall (Osaka), 30 August – 31 August: Hiroshima Kouseinenkin kaikan (Hiroshima), 5 September – 7 September: Fukuoka Shimin Kaikan Dai-Hall (Fukuoka), 13 September – 15 September: Niigata Prefectural Civic Center Dai-Hall (Niigata), 19 September – 21 September: Nagano Shimin Kaikan (Nagano), 26 September – 28 September: Minami Souma  Shimin Bunka Kaikan Dai-Hall (Fukushima), 3 October – 5 October: Aichi-ken Kinrou Kaikan (Aichi), 10 October – 12 October: NOVEL HALL (Taiwan), 17 October – 19 October: COEX (Korea), 30 October – 3 November: Tokyo Metropolitan Art Space Chuu-Hall (Tokyo)
Director:   Yukio Ueshima 
Choreography:   Yukio Ueshima and Shinnosuke Motoyama 
Music:  Toshihiko Sahashi
Lyrics:  Yuuji Mitsuya 
Screenplay:  Hideki Mitsui
Story:  Covers the matches of Seigaku against rival school Hyotei Gakuen in the National tournament.
Special notes:  Debut of the fifth Seigaku cast. Hiroki Aiba returned temporarily as Shusuke Fuji. Guest starring Higa Chuu. It's the first musical in the series to be performed overseas, with shows in Taiwan and South-Korea. Also the first musical with Double cast. Both casts took turns performing the musical for different performances. Kazuki Kato and Takumi Saito returned for the October performances on request of the fans. For several reasons Kei Hosogai took over for Ryunosuke Kawai as Wakashi Hiyoshi during the performances in Hiroshima, Fukuoka en Niigata and played the role alongside Hyoutei A. Li Yong En portrayed the role of Chotaroh Ootori during all performances in Taiwan.
Cast: 
Seigaku 4th:  Shōgo Sakamoto as Ryoma EchizenDaisuke Watanabe as Kunimitsu TezukaYuya Toyoda as Shuichiro OishiYuuta Furukawa as Shusuke FujiKyousuke Hamao as Eiji KikumaruYuuta Takahashi as Sadaharu InuiTetsuya Makita as Takeshi MomoshiroYuuichirou Hirata as Kaoru KaidohTeyu Kon as Takashi Kawamura (Korean)Ryo Yamada as Satoshi HorioTsubasa Itou as Kachiro KatoKouichi Eguchi as Katsuo Mizuno
Seigaku 5th:  Ryuki Takahashi as Ryoma EchizenRyoma Baba as Kunimitsu TezukaYuki Tsujimoto as Shuichiro OishiHiroki Aiba as Shusuke FujiShouta Takazaki as Eiji KikumaruYusuke Arai as Sadaharu InuiToshihiro Nobuyama as Takeshi MomoshiroAkihiro Hayashi as Kaoru KaidohIkko Chou as Takashi Kawamura (Korean)Shun Maruyama as Satoshi HorioHiroki Hirai as Kachiro KatoMasashi Watanabe as Katsuo Mizuno
Hyoutei  A:  Yuki Kubota as Keigo AtobeRyo Washimi as Munehiro KabajiShintarou Akiyama as Yuushi OshitariRuito Aoyagi as Gakuto MukahiKenta Kamakari as Ryoh ShishidoSeto Yuusuke as Ootori ChotarohTakuya Konma as Jirou AkutagawaRyunosuke Kawai as Wakashi Hiyoshi
Hyoutei B: Masahiro Inoue as Keigo AtobeShintarou Akiyama as Yuushi OshitariSeiji Fukuyama as Gakuto MukahiRyouta Murai as Ryou ShishidoLi Yong En as Choutarou Ohtori (Taiwanese)Taiki Naitou as Jirou AkutagawaJouji Kawada as Munehiro KabajiKei Hosogai as Wakashi Hiyoshi
October:  Kazuki Kato as Keigo AtobeTakumi Saito as Yuushi Oshitari

Higa:  Hijiri Shinotani as Yuujirou KaiLuke.C (Yousuke Crawford) as Eishirou KiteTakeshi Hayashino as Hiroshi ChinenYasuka Saito as Rin HirakobaYutaka Matsuzaki as Kei Tanishi

The Treasure Match Shitenhouji feat. Hyoutei

The Treasure Match Shitenhouji

Year:  2008 - 2009
Date & Place:  13 December – 25 December: Tokyo Seinen-kan Hall (Tokyo), 28 December 2008 – 4 January 2009: Osaka Mielparque Hall (Osaka), 10 January – 12 January: Shizuoka-city Shimizu Cultural Center (shizuoka), 17 January – 18 January: Ishikawa Kouseinenkin Kaikan (Kanazawa), 23 January – 25 January: Aichi-ken Kinrou Kaikan (Nagoya), 6 February – 7 February: Fukuoka Shimin Kaikan Dai-Hall (Fukuoka), 14 February – 15 February: Hiroshima Kouseinenkin Kaikan (Hiroshima), 21 February – 22 February: Shimonoseki Shimin Kaikan Dai-Hall (Shimonoseki), 28 February – 1 March: Iwate Prefectural Hall (Morioka), 20 March – 22 March: Novel Hall Shinbutai (Taiwan), 26 March – 31 March: Nippon Seinen-kan Hall (Tokyo)
Director:   Yukio Ueshima 
Choreography:   Yukio Ueshima and Shinnosuke Motoyama 
Music:  Toshihiko Sahashi
Lyrics:  Yuuji Mitsuya 
Screenplay:  Hideki Mitsui
Story:  Covers the matches between Seigaku and rival school Shitenhouji
Special notes:  Debut of Hashimoto Taito as fifth cast's Shusuke Fuji. The shows between December 13 – January 25 were performed by Seigaku 4th, Shitenhouji A, Yuki Kubota as Hyoutei's Keigo Atobe and Shintaro Akiyama as Hyoutei's Yuushi Oshitari + another Hyoutei member and Akutsu (A) or Tachibana (A). The shows between February 6 and March 31 were performed by Seigaku 5th, Shitenhouji B, Yuki Kubota as Hyoutei's Keigo Atobe, Ryouta Murai as Hyoutei's Shishido Ryoh + another Hyoutei member and Akutsu (B) or Tachibana (B).
Cast: 
Seigaku 4th:  Shōgo Sakamoto as Ryoma Echizen, Daisuke Watanabe as Kunimitsu TezukaYuya Toyoda as Shuichiro OishiYuuta Furukawa as Shusuke FujiKyousuke Hamao as Eiji KikumaruYuuta Takahashi as Sadaharu InuiTetsuya Makita as Takeshi MomoshiroYuuichirou Hirata as Kaoru KaidohTeyu Kon as Takashi Kawamura (Korean)Ryo Yamada as Satoshi HorioTsubasa Itou as Kachiro KatoKouichi Eguchi as Katsuo Mizuno
Seigaku 5th:  Ryuki Takahashi as Ryoma EchizenRyoma Baba as Kunimitsu TezukaYuki Tsujimoto as Shuichiro OishiHashimoto Taito as Shusuke FujiShouta Takazaki as Eiji KikumaruYusuke Arai as Sadaharu InuiToshihiro Nobuyama as Takeshi MomoshiroAkihiro Hayashi as Kaoru KaidohIkko Chou as Takashi Kawamura (Korean)Shun Maruyama as Satoshi HorioHiroki Hirai as Kachiro KatoRio Takahashi as Katsuo Mizuno
Shitenhouji A:  Harukawa Kyousuke as Kuranosuke ShiraishiKido Yuuya as Kintarō TooyamaRyuuko Isogai as Senri ChitoseUehara Takuya as Kenya OshitariHisanori Satou as Hikaru ZaizenYuusuke Hirose as Gin IshidaTakeya Nishiyama as Koharu KonjikiRyo Hirano as Yuuji Hitōji
Shitenhouji B:  Yoshihide Sasaki as Kuranosuke ShiraishiTakuya Kawaharada as Kintarō TooyamaMasashi Ooyama as Senri ChitoseKouki Mizuta as Kenya OshitariBishin Kawasumi as Hikaru ZaizenYuuta Yoneyama as Gin IshidaManabu Iizumi as Koharu KonjikiMakoto Uenobori as Yuuji Hitōji
Fudomine: Takashi Kitadai (A) and YOH (B) as Kippei Tachibana
Yamabuki:  JURI (A) and Ryoutarou Shimizu (B) as Jin Akutsu

Dream Live 6th

Dream Live 6th 

Year:  2009
Date & Place:  2 May – 3 May: Tokyo Metropolitan Gymnasium (Tokyo), 9 May – 10 May: Kobe World Memorial Hall (Kobe)
Director:   Yukio Ueshima 
Choreography:   Yukio Ueshima and Shinnosuke Motoyama 
Music:  Toshihiko Sahashi
Lyrics:  Yuuji Mitsuya 
Screenplay:  Hideki Mitsui
Story:  Sixth live concert 
Special notes:  Features both Seigaku casts, guest starring members Hyoutei, Shitenhouji, Higa Chuu, Rikkaidai, Yamabuki and Fudomine. Bishin Kawasumi didn't return and Hisanori Satou performed the role of Zaizen with Shitenhouji A and B. Also the graduation show for the fourth generation Seigaku cast. 
Cast: 
Seigaku 4th:  Shōgo Sakamoto as Ryoma EchizenDaisuke Watanabe as Kunimitsu TezukaYuya Toyoda as Shuichiro OishiYuuta Furukawa as Shusuke FujiKyousuke Hamao as Eiji KikumaruYuuta Takahashi as Sadaharu InuiTetsuya Makita as Takeshi MomoshiroYuuichirou Hirata as Kaoru KaidohTeyu Kon as Takashi Kawamura (Korean)Ryo Yamada as Satoshi HorioTsubasa Itou as Kachiro KatoKouichi Eguchi as Katsuo Mizuno
Seigaku 5th:  Ryuki Takahashi as Ryoma EchizenRyoma Baba as Kunimitsu TezukaYuki Tsujimoto as Shuichiro OishiHashimoto Taito as Shusuke FujiShouta Takazaki as Eiji KikumaruYusuke Arai as Sadaharu InuiToshihiro Nobuyama as Takeshi MomoshiroAkihiro Hayashi as Kaoru KaidohIkko Chou as Takashi Kawamura (Korean)Shun Maruyama as Satoshi HorioHiroki Hirai as Kachiro KatoRie Takahashi as Katsuo MizunoYukio Ueshima as Nanjiroh Echizen
Shitenhouji A:  Harukawa Kyousuke as Kuranosuke ShiraishiKido Yuuya as Kintarō TooyamaRyuuko Isogai as Senri ChitoseUehara Takuya as Kenya OshitariHisanori Satou as Hikaru ZaizenYuusuke Hirose as Gin IshidaTakeya Nishiyama as Koharu KonjikiRyo Hirano as Yuuji Hitōji
Shitenhouji B:  Yoshihide Sasaki as Kuranosuke ShiraishiTakuya Kawaharada as Kintarō TooyamaMasashi Ooyama as Senri ChitoseKouki Mizuta as Kenya OshitariYuuta Yoneyama as Gin IshidaManabu Iizumi as Koharu KonjikiMakoto Uenobori as Yuuji Hitōji
Hyoutei: Yuki Kubota as Keigo AtobeShintaro Akiyama as Yuushi OshitariSeiji Fukuyama as Gakuto MukahiRyota Murai as Ryou ShishidoYusuke Seto as Choutarou OotoriTaiki Naito as Jirou AkutagawaJoji Kawada as Munehiro KabajiKei Hosogai as Wakashi Hiyoshi
Higa: Luke.C (Yousuke Crawford) as Eishirou KiteTakeshi Hayashino as Hiroshi ChinenYutaka Matsuzaki as Kei Tanishi
Rikkai:  Kentarou Kanesaki as Genichirou Sanada
Yamabuki:  Ryotaro Shimizu as Jin Akutsu
Fudomine: Takashi Kitadai as Kippei Tachibana

The Final Match Rikkai First feat. Shitenhouji

The Final Match Rikkaidai First 

Year:  2009
Date & Place: 30 July – 16 August: Nippon Seinen-kan Hall (Tokyo), 19 August – 26 August: Osaka Mielparque Hall (Osaka), 29 August – 30 August: Hiroshima Kouseinenkin Kaikan (Hiroshima), 4 September – 6 September: Aichi-ken Kinrou Kaikan (Nagoya), 19 September – 21 September: Sendai Cultural Foundation Izumiti21 (Sendai), 26 September – 27 September: Fukuoka Shimin Kaikan Dai-Hall (Fukuoka), 1 October – 4 October: JCB Hall (Tokyo), 4 October 17:00: ‘Live Viewing’ 19 cinema's all around the country
Director:   Yukio Ueshima 
Choreography:   Yukio Ueshima and Shinnosuke Motoyama 
Music:  Toshihiko Sahashi
Lyrics:  Yuuji Mitsuya 
Screenplay:  Hideki Mitsui
Story:  Covers all matches, except singles one, against Rikkaidai during the National tournament
Special notes:  Guest starring Shitenhouji
Cast: 
Seigaku:  Ryuki Takahashi as Ryoma EchizenRyoma Baba as Kunimitsu TezukaYuki Tsujimoto as Shuichiro OishiHashimoto Taito as Shusuke FujiShouta Takazaki as Eiji KikumaruYusuke Arai as Sadaharu InuiIkko Chou as Takashi Kawamura (Korean)Toshihiro Nobuyama as Takeshi MomoshiroAkihiro Hayashi as Kaoru KaidohShun Maruyama as Satoshi HorioHiroki Hirai as Kachiro KatoRie Takahashi as Katsuo Mizuno
Rikkai:  Toshiki Masuda as Seiichi YukimuraKentarou Kanesaki as Genichirou SanadaYuuki Yamaoki as Renji YanagiToru Baba as Hiroshi YagyuuMasataka Nakagauchi as Masaharu NiouGenki Ookawa as Akaya KiriharaMio Akaba as Bunta MaruiShingo Toda as Jackal Kuwahara
Rikkai Support:  Onoda Ryuunosuke as Hiroshi YagyuuTaisuke Wada as Masaharu NiouMitsuaki Nishimura as Akaya Kirihara
Shitenhouji A:  Harukawa Kyousuke as Kuranosuke ShiraishiKido Yuuya as Kintarō TooyamaRyuuko Isogai as Senri ChitoseUehara Takuya as Kenya OshitariHisanori Satou as Hikaru ZaizenYuusuke Hirose as Gin IshidaTakeya Nishiyama as Koharu KonjikiRyo Hirano as Yuuji Hitōji
Shitenhouji B:  Yoshihide Sasaki as Kuranosuke ShiraishiTakuya Kawaharada as Kintarō TooyamaMasashi Ooyama as Senri ChitoseKouki Mizuta as Kenya OshitariYuuta Yoneyama as Gin IshidaManabu Iizumi as Koharu KonjikiMakoto Uenobori as Yuuji Hitōji

The Final Match Rikkai Second feat. Rivals

The Final Match Rikkaidai Second 

Year:  2009 - 2010
Date & Place:  17 December – 24 December: Nippon Seinen-kan Hall (Tokyo), 27 December 2009 – 11 January 2010: Osaka Mielparque Hall (Osaka), 15 January – 17 January: Chukyo University Center for Culture & Arts: former Nagoya Shimin Kaikan Chuu-Hall (Nagoya), 29 January – 30 January: Honda no Mori Hall former Ishikawa Kouseinenkin Kaikan (Kanazawa ), 5 February – 7 February: Hiroshima Kouseinenkin Kaikan (Hiroshima), 12 February – 13 February: Fukuoka Sun Palace (Fukuoka), 20 February – 21 February: Natori City Cultural Foundation (Sendai), 26 February – 14 March: JCB HALL (Tokyo), 14 March 17:00: ‘Live Viewing’ 27 cinemas all around the country
Director:   Yukio Ueshima 
Choreography:   Yukio Ueshima and Shinnosuke Motoyama 
Music:  Toshihiko Sahashi
Lyrics:  Yuuji Mitsuya 
Screenplay:  Hideki Mitsui
Story:  Covers the singles one match between Ryoma Echizen and Seiichi Yukimura during the National tournament. 
Special notes:  Last story-line musical
Cast: 
Seigaku:  Ryuki Takahashi as Ryoma EchizenRyoma Baba as Kunimitsu TezukaYuki Tsujimoto as Shuichiro OishiHashimoto Taito as Shusuke FujiShouta Takazaki as Eiji KikumaruYusuke Arai as Sadaharu InuiIkko Chou as Takashi Kawamura (Korean)Toshihiro Nobuyama as Takeshi MomoshiroAkihiro Hayashi as Kaoru KaidohShun Maruyama as Satoshi HorioHiroki Hirai as Kachiro KatoRie Takahashi as Katsuo MizunoYukio Ueshima and Shinnosuke Motoyama as Nanjiroh Echizen
Rikkai:  Toshiki Masuda as Seiichi YukimuraKentarou Kanesaki as Genichirou SanadaYuuki Yamaoki as Renji YanagiToru Baba as Hiroshi YagyuuMasataka Nakagauchi as Masaharu NiouGenki Ookawa as Akaya KiriharaMio Akaba as Bunta MaruiShingo Toda as Jackal Kuwahara
Rikkai Support:  Onoda Ryuunosuke as Hiroshi YagyuuTaisuke Wada as Masaharu NiouMitsuaki Nishimura as Akaya Kirihara
Fudomine:  Oota Motohiro as Shinji Ibu
St.Rudolph:  KENN as Yuuta Fuji
Yamabuki:  JURI and Ryotaro Shimizu as Jin Akutsu
Hyoutei: Yuki Kubota as Keigo Atobe and Kei Hosogai as Wakashi Hiyoshi
Higa:  Yutaka Matsuzaki as Kei Tanishi
Shitenhouji:  Harukawa Kyousuke (A) and Yoshihide Sasaki (B) as Kuranosuke ShiraishiKido Yuuya (A) and Takuya Kawaharada (B) as Kintarō Tooyama

Dream Live 7th

Dream Live 7th 

Year:  2010
Date & Place:  7 May – 9 May: Kobe World Memorial Hall (Kobe), 20 May – 23 May: Yokohama Arena (Yokohama)
Director:   Yukio Ueshima 
Choreography:   Yukio Ueshima and Shinnosuke Motoyama 
Music:  Toshihiko Sahashi
Lyrics:  Yuuji Mitsuya 
Screenplay:  Hideki Mitsui
Story:  Seventh Live Concert
Special notes:  Last performance of the first season. The 1st Seigaku cast made a brief return during the Live. Every show featured special guests (former actors in the play). Also the Graduation show of the 5th Seigaku cast.
Cast: 
Seigaku 5th:  Ryuki Takahashi as Ryoma EchizenRyoma Baba as Kunimitsu TezukaYuki Tsujimoto as Shuichiro OishiHashimoto Taito as Shusuke FujiShouta Takazaki as Eiji KikumaruYusuke Arai as Sadaharu InuiIkko Chou as Takashi Kawamura (Korean)Toshihiro Nobuyama as Takeshi MomoshiroAkihiro Hayashi as Kaoru KaidohShun Maruyama as Satoshi HorioHiroki Hirai as Kachiro KatoRie Takahashi as Katsuo MizunoYukio Ueshima and Shinnosuke Motoyama as Nanjiroh Echizen
Rikkai:  Toshiki Masuda as Seiichi YukimuraKentarou Kanesaki as Genichirou SanadaYuuki Yamaoki as Renji YanagiToru Baba as Hiroshi YagyuuMasataka Nakagauchi as Masaharu NiouMio Akaba as Bunta MaruiShingo Toda as Jackal KuwaharaGenki Ookawa as Akaya Kirihara
Rikkai Support:  Onoda Ryuunosuke as Hiroshi YagyuuTaisuke Wada as Masaharu NiouMitsuaki Nishimura as Akaya Kirihara
Shitenhouji A:  Harukawa Kyousuke as Kuranosuke ShiraishiKido Yuuya as Kintarō TooyamaRyuuko Isogai as Senri ChitoseHisanori Satou as Hikaru ZaizenYuusuke Hirose as Gin IshidaTakeya Nishiyama as Koharu KonjikiRyo Hirano as Yuuji Hitōji
Shitenhouji B:  Yoshihide Sasaki as Kuranosuke ShiraishiTakuya Kawaharada as Kintarō TooyamaMasashi Ooyama as Senri ChitoseKouki Mizuta as Kenya OshitariYuuta Yoneyama as Gin IshidaManabu Iizumi as Koharu KonjikiMakoto Uenobori as Yuuji Hitōji
Fudomine:  Oota Motohiro as Shinji Ibu
St.Rudolph:  KENN as Yuuta Fuji
Yamabuki:  JURI and Ryotaro Shimizu as Jin Akutsu
Hyoutei:  Yuki Kubota as Keigo AtobeKei Hosogai as Wakashi Hiyoshi
Rokkaku:  Airu Shiozaki as Hikaru AmaneRyosuke Kato as Ryou Kisarazu
Higa:  Yutaka Matsuzaki as Kei Tanishi
Seigaku 1st:  Kotaro Yanagi as Ryoma EchizenEiji Takigawa as Kunimitsu TezukaTsuchiya Yuichi as Shuichiro OishiKimeru as Shusuke FujiTakashi Nagayama as Eiji KikumaruSota Aoyama as Sadaharu InuiEiki Kitamura as Takashi KawamuraEiji Moriyama as Takeshi MomoshiroNaoya Gomoto as Kaoru Kaidoh

Second season

Seigaku VS Fudomine
Seigaku VS Fudomine 

Year:  2011
Date & Place:  5 January – 16 January: JCB HALL (Tokyo), 19 January – 23 January: Osaka Mielparque Hall (Osaka), 26 January – 11 February: Nippon Seinen-kan Dai-Hall (Tokyo)
Adaption&Production: Yoshiko Iseki
Supervisor:   Yukio Ueshima 
Choreography:   Shinnosuke Motoyama 
Music:  Toshihiko Sahashi
Lyrics:  Yuuji Mitsuya 
Screenplay:  Hideki Mitsui
Story:  Covers Echizen arrival at Seigaku until the end of the matches against Fudomine
Special notes:  First Musical of the 2nd season. Debut of the 6th Seigaku cast.
Cast: 
Seigaku:  Yuuki Ogoe as Ryoma EchizenTakuma Wada as Kunimitsu TezukaJin Hiramaki as Shuichiro OishiRyou Mitsuya as Shusuke FujiYuta Koseki as Eiji KikumaruTeruma as Sadaharu InuiTomohiro Tsurumi as Takashi KawamuraToru Kamitsuru as Takeshi MomoshiroRyousuke Ikeoka as Kaoru Kaidohkento Masui as Satoshi HorioShunya Oohira as Kachiro KatoMizuki Oono as Katsuo MizunoShinnosuke Motoyama as Nanjiroh Echizen
Fudomine: Yuusuke Ueda as Kippei TachibanaKazuhiro Okazaki as Shinji IbuKinari Hirano as Akira KamioKyoushirou Takagi as Tetsu Ishida Mao Kato as Kyosuke Uchimura  Youichiro Omi as Tatsunori Mori Fumiya Takahashi as Masaya Sakurai

Seigaku VS St. Rudolph and Yamabuki
Seigaku VS St. Rudolph and Yamabuki 

Year:  2011
Date & Place:  31 March – 17 April: Tokyo Dome City Hall (Tokyo), 27 April - 3 May: Osaka Mielparque Hall (Osaka), 8 May – 15 May: Tokyo Dome City Hall (Tokyo)
Adaption&Production: Yoshiko Iseki
Supervisor:   Yukio Ueshima 
Choreography:   Shinnosuke Motoyama 
Music:  Toshihiko Sahashi
Lyrics:  Yuuji Mitsuya 
Screenplay:  Hideki Mitsui
Story:  Covers the matches between Seigaku and rival schools St. Rudolph and Yamabuki
Special notes:  All performances between 31 March and 7 April have been cancelled, due to the Tōhoku earthquake and tsunami that hit Japan at 11 March
Cast: 
Seigaku:  Yuuki Ogoe as Ryoma EchizenTakuma Wada as Kunimitsu TezukaJin Hiramaki as Shuichiro OishiRyou Mitsuya as Shusuke FujiYuta Koseki as Eiji KikumaruTeruma as Sadaharu InuiTomohiro Tsurumi as Takashi KawamuraToru Kamitsuru as Takeshi MomoshiroRyousuke Ikeoka as Kaoru Kaidohkento Masui as Satoshi HorioShunya Oohira as Kachiro KatoMizuki Oono as Katsuo MizunoShinnosuke Motoyama as Nanjiroh Echizen
St. Rudolph: Yutaka Kobayashi as Hajime MizukiSeiya Konishi as Yuuta FujiKenta Iduka as Yoshirou AkazawaSho Jin’nai as Shinya YanagisawaDaisuke Hirose as Atsushi KisarazuShotaro Ookubo as Ichirou Kaneda
Yamabuki: Takuya Kishimoto as Jin AkutsuReiya Masaki as Taichi DanSeiya as Kiyosumi SengokuJoji Saotome as Kentarou MinamiTakeshi Terayama as Masami HigashikataKensho Ono as Muromachi Toji

Seigaku VS Hyoutei
Seigaku VS Hyoutei 

Year:  2011
Date & Place:  15 July - 31 July: Tokyo Dome City Hall (Tokyo), 10 August - 21 August: Osaka Mielparque Hall (Osaka), 31 August - 4 September: Chukyo University Center for Culture & Arts(Nagoya), 8 September - 11 September: Canal City (Fukuoka), 22 September - 24 September: Tokyo Dome City hall (Tokyo)
Adaption&Production: Yoshiko Iseki
Supervisor:   Yukio Ueshima 
Choreography:   Shinnosuke Motoyama 
Music:  Toshihiko Sahashi
Lyrics:  Yuuji Mitsuya 
Screenplay:  Hideki Mitsui
Story:  Covers the matches between Seigaku and rival school Hyoutei
Special notes:  Mao Kato & Youichiro Omi, Sho Jin'nai & Daisuke Hirose, Joji Saotome & Takeshi Terayama will appear as daily guest
Cast: 
Seigaku:Yuuki Ogoe as Ryoma EchizenTakuma Wada as Kunimitsu TezukaJin Hiramaki as Shuichiro OishiRyou Mitsuya as Shusuke FujiYuta Koseki as Eiji KikumaruTeruma as Sadaharu InuiTomohiro Tsurumi as Takashi KawamuraToru Kamitsuru as Takeshi MomoshiroRyousuke Ikeoka as Kaoru Kaidohkento Masui as Satoshi HorioShunya Oohira as Kachiro KatoMizuki Oono as Katsuo MizunoShinnosuke Motoyama as Nanjiroh Echizen
Hyoutei:Tsunenori Aoki as Keigo AtobeTakuya Kikuchi as Yuushi OshitariJun Shison as Gakuto MukahiKousuke Kuwano as Ryou ShishidoTomoru Akazawa as Jirou AkutagawaHiroyuki Furuie as Munehiro KabajiKento Nishijima as Haginosuke TakiJin Shirasu as Choutarou OotoriDaiki Ise as Wakashi Hiyoshi
Fudomine:Kinari Hirano as Akira KamioMao Kato as Kyosuke UchimuraYouichiro Omi as Tatsunori Mori
St. Rudolph:Seiya Konishi as Yuuta FujiSho Jin’nai as Shinya YanagisawaDaisuke Hirose as Atsushi Kisarazu
Yamabuki:Seiya as Kiyosumi SengokuJoji Saotome as Kentarou MinamiTakeshi Terayama as Masami Higashikata

See also
The Prince of Tennis Musical Music List

Reference list

Musicals based on anime and manga
The Prince of Tennis